Noel Laurence Allanson (25 December 1925 – 7 February 2022) was an Australian rules footballer who played with Essendon in the Victorian Football League (VFL).

Family
The son of Laurence Alexander Allanson (1898-1987), and Eva Charlotte Allanson (1900-1975), née Syer, Noel Laurence Allanson was born at North Carlton, Victoria on Christmas Day (25 December) 1925.

He married Betty Grace Walton on 13 March 1951 at Essendon North, Victoria.

Military service
Prior to his sporting career, Allanson served as an able seaman in the Royal Australian Navy during the later stages of World War II, and was present in Tokyo Bay in 1945 when the Japanese surrender was signed aboard the United States Navy battleship .

Football

Essendon (VFL)
Allanson was an Essendon local and at the end of his debut season played in the 1947 VFL Grand Final. Essendon lost the game but he got another chance to play in a premiership in 1950, this time finishing on the winning team.

He was a defender and kicked the only goal of his career at Glenferrie Oval against Hawthorn.

Williamstown (VFA)
During 1951, Allanson transferred to Williamstown in the VFA and played 26 games over two seasons, kicking one goal, and winning the club's most effective player award in 1952, as well as the Williamstown Chronicle best player award.

Cricket
In 1957 Allanson played a first-class cricket match for Victoria against Tasmania, making 24 in his only innings.
Noel Allanson passed away on Monday 7th February, aged 96.Noel played 180 Premier 1st XI matches across 18 seasons from 1942/43 to 1962/63, scoring 4,463 runs @ 24.65 with 4 centuries (top of 110) and 18 half centuries, taking 20 wickets @ 26.20 (best 4/22) and 72 catches.Noel also served as Essendon CC Secretary in 1969/70.Noel represented Victoria in 1 First Class game in the 1956/57 against Tasmania, holding Cap #577.Noel was only required to bat once (scoring 24) and took a catch in the 1st Innings. — Obituary, Cricket Victoria, 9 February 2022.

Club official
Allanson was vice-president of Essendon Football Club in 1976 and 1977 and treasurer from 1978 to early 1991. He was inducted into the Club's Hall of Fame in 2015.

Death
Noel Allanson died at East Malvern, Victoria on 7 February 2022, at the age of 96.

See also
 List of Victoria first-class cricketers

Notes

References
 World War Two Nominal Roll: Able Seaman Noel Lawrence Allanson (PM7211), Department of Veterans' Affairs
 World War Two Service Record: Able Seaman Noel Lawrence Allanson (PM7211), National Archives of Australia
 League Teams of 1950 — Essendon, The Argus, (Saturday, 3 June 1950), p.1.
 
 Holmesby, Russell & Main, Jim (2014), The Encyclopedia of AFL Footballers: every AFL/VFL player since 1897 (10th ed.), Melbourne, Victoria: Bas Publishing. 
 Maplestone, M., Flying Higher: History of the Essendon Football Club 1872–1996, Essendon Football Club, (Melbourne), 1996.

External links
 
 
 Noel Allanson, at The VFA Project
 
 CricketArchive: Noel Allanson

1925 births
2022 deaths
Royal Australian Navy personnel of World War II
Essendon Football Club players
Essendon Football Club Premiership players
Australian cricketers
Victoria cricketers
Australian rules footballers from Melbourne
Cricketers from Melbourne
Royal Australian Navy sailors
One-time VFL/AFL Premiership players
People from Carlton North, Victoria
Military personnel from Melbourne
Essendon Football Club administrators